Kim Hye-ri (born December 23, 1969) is a South Korean actress.

Filmography

Film

Television series

Variety show

Awards and nominations

References

External links 
 
 
 
 

1969 births
Living people
South Korean film actresses
South Korean television actresses
Dongguk University alumni
People from Seoul
Miss Korea delegates
Miss World 1989 delegates